The 1977 San Francisco Giants season was the Giants' 95th season in Major League Baseball, their 20th season in San Francisco since their move from New York following the 1957 season, and their 18th at Candlestick Park. The team finished in fourth place in the National League West with a 75–87 record, 23 games behind the Los Angeles Dodgers.

Offseason 
 October 20, 1976: Mike Caldwell, Dave Rader and John D'Acquisto were traded by the Giants to the St. Louis Cardinals for Willie Crawford, John Curtis and Vic Harris.
 December 7, 1976: Jeff Yurak was drafted from the Giants by the Milwaukee Brewers in the 1976 minor league draft.
 January 11, 1977: Bud Black was drafted by the Giants in the 3rd round of the 1977 Major League Baseball draft, but did not sign.
 February 11, 1977: Bobby Murcer, Steve Ontiveros, and Andy Muhlstock (minors) were traded by the Giants to the Chicago Cubs for Bill Madlock and Rob Sperring.
 March 26, 1977: Willie Crawford and Rob Sperring were traded by the Giants to the Houston Astros for Rob Andrews and cash.
 March 26, 1977: Chris Bourjos was signed as an amateur free agent by the Giants.
 March 31, 1977: Ken Rudolph was purchased by the Giants from the St. Louis Cardinals.

Regular season

Season standings

Record vs. opponents

Opening Day starters

Notable transactions 
 May 19, 1977: DeWayne Buice was signed as an amateur free agent by the Giants.
 June 7, 1977: Chili Davis was drafted by the Giants in the 11th round of the 1977 Major League Baseball draft. Player signed September 3, 1977.
 July 27, 1977: Ken Rudolph was purchased from the Giants by the Baltimore Orioles.
 August 11, 1977: Gorman Heimueller was signed as an amateur free agent by the Giants.

Roster

Player stats

Batting

Starters by position 
Note: Pos = Position; G = Games played; AB = At bats; H = Hits; Avg. = Batting average; HR = Home runs; RBI = Runs batted in

Other batters 
Note: G = Games played; AB = At bats; H = Hits; Avg. = Batting average; HR = Home runs; RBI = Runs batted in

Pitching

Starting pitchers 
Note: G = Games pitched; IP = Innings pitched; W = Wins; L = Losses; ERA = Earned run average; SO = Strikeouts

Other pitchers 
Note: G = Games pitched; IP = Innings pitched; W = Wins; L = Losses; ERA = Earned run average; SO = Strikeouts

Relief pitchers 
Note: G = Games pitched; W = Wins; L = Losses; SV = Saves; ERA = Earned run average; SO = Strikeouts

Awards and honors 
Willie McCovey, Hutch Award

All-Stars 
All-Star Game

Farm system 

LEAGUE CHAMPIONS: Phoenix

References

External links
 1977 San Francisco Giants at Baseball Reference
 1977 San Francisco Giants at Baseball Almanac

San Francisco Giants seasons
San Francisco Giants season
San Fran